The Hunter 260 is an American trailerable sailboat, that was designed by Rob Mazza and the Hunter Design Team and first built in 1997.

The Hunter 260 is a development of the Hunter 26.

Production
The boat was built by Hunter Marine in the United States between 1997 and 2005, but it is now out of production.

Design
The Hunter 260 is a small recreational keelboat, built predominantly of fiberglass. It is a fractional B&R rigged sloop, with a transom-hung rudder and a folding centerboard keel. It displaces  and carries  of water ballast.

The boat is normally fitted with a small outboard motor for docking and maneuvering.

The boat has a PHRF racing average handicap of 213 with a high of 220 and low of 206.

See also
List of sailing boat types

Similar sailboats
Beneteau First 26
Beneteau First 265
C&C 26
C&C 26 Wave
Contessa 26
Dawson 26
Discovery 7.9
Grampian 26
Herreshoff H-26
Hunter 26
Hunter 26.5
Hunter 240
Hunter 270
MacGregor 26
Mirage 26
Nash 26
Nonsuch 26
Outlaw 26
Paceship PY 26
Parker Dawson 26
Pearson 26
Sandstream 26
Tanzer 26
Yamaha 26

References

External links

Official brochure

Keelboats
1990s sailboat type designs
Sailing yachts
Trailer sailers
Sailboat type designs by Rob Mazza
Sailboat type designs by Hunter Design Team
Sailboat types built by Hunter Marine